Burn Hall is a country house in County Durham. It is a Grade II* listed building.

History
Around 1812, Bryan John Salvin of Croxdale purchased a manor house, dating back to the 13th century, called New Burnhall. Ignatius Bonomi redesigned it from 1821 to 1834 in the gothic and neoclassical style under the name Burn Hall. It remained in the wealthy Salvin family until Marmaduke Henry Salvin died in 1924 and it was acquired by Saint Joseph's Missionary Society of Mill Hill which established a boys' school there.

The seminary closed to full time students in June 1971, when the costs of training priests became prohibitive. In 1995, the building was sold by the Society to Mrs Audrey Alliston. The restoration of the main house and the redevelopment of the area to the rear, by Jane Darbyshire Associates, won the City Trust's architectural commendation of the year in 1998.

References

Further reading
Margot Johnson. "Burn Hall" in Durham: Historic and University City and surrounding area. Sixth Edition. Turnstone Ventures. 1992. . Page 38.

Country houses in County Durham